Novoperedelkino is a station on the Kalininsko-Solntsevskaya line of the Moscow Metro. It opened on August 30, 2018 as part of the line's "Ramenki"—"Rasskazovka" extension. This is the penultimate station on the southern branch.

It is in the Novo-Peredelkino District of Moscow and takes its name from the district.

References

Moscow Metro stations
Kalininsko-Solntsevskaya line
Railway stations in Russia opened in 2018
Railway stations located underground in Russia